Hugo James (died 1835) was a planter in Jamaica, the owner of Mount Moreland estate. He was elected to the House of Assembly of Jamaica in 1820. In 1829 he was appointed Attorney General of Jamaica.

References 

Members of the House of Assembly of Jamaica
Planters from the British West Indies
Year of birth unknown
1835 deaths
Attorneys General of the Colony of Jamaica